The Penguin History of Britain is a popular book series on British history, published by Penguin Books. It appeared in nine volumes between 1996 and 2018, with many of the individual works subsequently being republished in several editions. Its general editor is David Cannadine, who also contributed a volume himself. Collectively, the books in the series span the period 54 BC to 1990 and include:
 An Imperial Possession: Britain in the Roman Empire, 54 BC-AD 409 (2006) by David Mattingly
 Britain After Rome: The Fall and Rise, 400 to 1070 (2010) by Robin Fleming
 The Struggle for Mastery: Britain, 1066-1284 (2003) by David Carpenter
 The Hollow Crown: A History of Britain in the Late Middle Ages (2005) by Miri Rubin
 New Worlds, Lost Worlds: The Rule of the Tudors, 1485-1603 (2000) by Susan Brigden
 A Monarchy Transformed: Britain, 1603-1714 (1996) by Mark Kishlansky
 A Wealth of Nations? Britain, 1707-1815 by Linda Colley (To be published)
 Victorious Century: The United Kingdom, 1800-1906 (2018) by David Cannadine
 Hope and Glory: Britain 1900-1990 (1996) by Peter Clarke, updated in two successive editions to cover the period to 2000 and 2002 respectively
The series is primarily envisaged as a narrative history of Britain, intended to update the "Whiggish" approach of older studies. It was particularly intended to supersede the Pelican History of England (1950–1965) which, though influential, was considered "dated". The series was intended to engage with "the fact of decline, political, imperial, military and economic" in British power. It was framed as "consciously British" (rather than English) and put particular "focus on Britain’s world position primarily with reference to the 'three circles' of Europe, the Empire and the United States".

See also
New Oxford History of England (1989—)

References

1990s books
2000s books
2010s books
Historiography of England
Series of history books
Penguin Books book series